Dzodze is a small town, the capital and administrative centre of Ketu North Municipality, a district in the south eastern corner of the Volta Region of Ghana.  From the Exodus of the Ewe people, some of them arrived and stayed in Dzodze, in the Volta Region of Ghana after the fall of the wall of Notse. The natives speak Ewe (Eʋe) the main language in Dzodze. They are an Anlo-Ewe community. The traditional rhythm of this land is Agbadja, and Ageshe.

Geography

Location
Dzodze is located near the border between Togo and Ghana, and lies 199 kilometers from the capital of Ghana, Accra through Tokor and 87 kilometers from Ho, the regional capital.

Suburbs or Electoral Areas 
Ablorme, Adagbledu, Fiagbedu, Apeyeme, Apetepe, Afiadenyigba, Kpordoave, Kave/Awlikorpe, Kasu/Tsiaveme/Torfoe, Kpelikorpe/Heheme, Kuli/Dzogbefime, Dorwuime/Bokorgakorpe and Deme/Tornu

Demographics
The inhabitants of Dzodze are primarily Ghanaian nationals who settled down after the exodus of Ewe people from Notsie in Togo to the South West of Ghana sometime in the later part of the seventeenth century, The Ewe language is the most widely spoken language in the town.

The meaning of Dzodze.

Dzodze is an Ewe language: Dzo = to fly. Dze = to land. Dzodze = flew and landed. According to the history, Torgbui Adzomefia's nephew Torgbui Amegayibor managed to cross the Aka river and settled on the part of the forest where his uncle Torgbui Adzomefia, and his people had already settled. During one of Torgbui Amegayibor's expeditions, he saw a cloud of smoke billowing from afar. He traced it to his uncle's village. He wondered how his uncle, and his family managed to cross the Aka River because he didn't see any human activity en route to the settlement. He asked his uncle, Torgbui Adzomefia, the means by which he got into the forest. This was the answer he got from his uncle; 'De mie dzo va dze.' we flew and landed. Hence the name Dzodze.

Production 
Dzodze is widely known for palm cultivation, which is further transformed into palm oil, palm wine, Akpteteshie (Local Gin).

Festival 
Dzodze celebrates an annual Palm festival called Deza.

References

Populated places in the Volta Region